Kleton Perntreou (born 8 January 1995) is an Albanian-Greek football goalkeeper who plays for Akritas Chlorakasin the Cypriot First division .

Career
Born in Tirana, Perntreou, who is of Greek descent, moved to Athens aged five.

In 2012, he moved to England and had a successful trial with Bristol City, where he joined the under-18 team. The following year he was offered a professional contract by the Robins, but rejected the offer and instead joined Hibernian. He spent the 2013–14 season in the under-20 team and made his senior debut in the Scottish Championship the following season, coming on as a half-time substitute for Mark Oxley against Cowdenbeath on 8 November 2014. He started the following game against Queen of the South, but made no further appearances for Hibs and was released at the end of the 2014–15 season. In July 2015, he signed for Crystal Palace. Perntreou was released by Crystal Palace on 1 September 2017, without having made a senior appearance for the club. Perntreou joined Welling United in October 2017.

On 21 March 2018, Perntreou signed for Chelmsford City. In October 2018, Perntreou joined Worthing. Later that season he played for Chatham Town and Margate. Perntreou joined Carshalton Athletic in August 2019. For the 2020–21 season he joined Cypriot Second Division club Akritas Chlorakas.

Career total

References

External links

1995 births
Living people
Footballers from Tirana
Albanian footballers
Greek expatriate footballers
Association football goalkeepers
Bristol City F.C. players
Hibernian F.C. players
Crystal Palace F.C. players
Welling United F.C. players
Chelmsford City F.C. players
Worthing F.C. players
Chatham Town F.C. players
Margate F.C. players
Carshalton Athletic F.C. players
Akritas Chlorakas players
Scottish Professional Football League players
National League (English football) players
Isthmian League players
Cypriot Second Division players
Albanian expatriate footballers
Expatriate footballers in England
Expatriate footballers in Scotland
Expatriate footballers in Cyprus
Albanian expatriate sportspeople in Scotland
Albanian expatriate sportspeople in England
Albanian expatriate sportspeople in Cyprus
Footballers from Athens
Greek footballers